Synthite Industries Private Ltd. is an Indian oleoresin extraction firm, world’s largest producer of spice extracts, spice powders, essential oils. Synthite has footprints in India, China, Brazil, USA, Vietnam and Sri Lanka. Synthite directly employs 2000 people and support farmer community of around 14000. The company headquarters is in Kochi. In 2008, Synthite had 30% of the world's market share. Some of its major clients include Nestle, Unilever, ITC, Bacardi and Pepsico. The company is currently run by the founder's son, Dr. Viju Jacob.

History and Growth of Synthite

1972 
The company was established in 1972 with 20 employees. It was founded by C. V. Jacob who started the company after working in civil construction for two decades. Initially it produced industrial chemicals before shifting to oleoresins. The oleoresin business was initially based on research by the Central Food Technological Research Institute in Mysore. However, the technology developed was not yet mature, and it took several years of additional research and development by Synthite to make the technology viable. It took another four years before they convinced food producers that they could produce quality products on time.

1985 
Commissions Herbal Isolates Private Limited for the manufacture of essential oils dehydrated green pepper, pepper in brine and sterilized spices

1986 
Inaugurates Marudur unit for the production of floral concretes and absolutes in technical collaboration with Cal-Pfizer, France.

1992 
Acquires Calicut Unit for solvent extraction.

1993 
Inaugurates C.U. Varkey Centre for Research and Quality Assurance

1997 
Synthite celebrates Silver Jubilee at Dorchester Hotel, London

2001 
Started Harihar Unit for manufacturing Paprika Oleoresin.

2006 
Establishes " Synthite Taste Park " comprising Spice Division , Aromco Flavour India Private Limited (a Joint venture with Aromco, United Kingdom)

2010 
Synthite set up offices in the United States and China.

2012 
Commissioned its first overseas production facility in Xinjiang, China with a production capacity of 550 tonnes per annum of paprika oleoresins.

2013 
Inaugurated a dedicated plant for chilli products at Ongole, Andhra Pradesh. And commissioned Telgi Unit for processing Marigold.

2014 
Started its first sales office in Brasil and LATAM, based in the city of Valinhos in São Paulo.

2017 
Synthite started a new office in Netherlands and Vietnam. As well as they commissioned Spice Plant in Unjha.

2018 
Synthite inaugurated it's blending facility in Sao Paulo, Brazil producing up to 190 tonnes per annum of oleoresin and essential oil blends.

2019 
Synthite started its third manufacturing facility located at Wucheng county in Dezhou in China's Shandong province. It was inaugurated by Indian Ambassador to China Vikram Misri along with local Chinese government officials. Some observers quoted by Outlook an Indian magazine feel that the company has over-invested in capacity, increasing their costs.

Trade union strike 
The Synthite Industries Employees’ Union (affiliated to CITU) had called a strike in the first week of April, 2018 after seven employees were transferred to other states. The 37-day-long strike was called off after talks held in the presence of the labour commissioner and turned violent.

References

External links 
 

Food and drink companies of India
Indian companies established in 1972